Nancy Shanks (c. 1956–2019) was an American singer.

Shanks was the vocalist for the earliest but short-lived lineup of the all-woman band Vixen after changing its name from Genesis (formerly Lemon Pepper), initially playing pop rock. Vixen is known for featuring the band's founder Jan Kuehnemund on lead guitar.

Shanks sang backing vocals on several of Tori Amos' albums, such as Little Earthquakes and Y Kant Tori Read.

Shanks also performed the song "Trials of the Heart" on the soundtrack for the film About Last Night..., and duetted with Danny Peck on the song "I Burn for You" on the soundtrack for the film The Secret of My Success.

Shanks died in May 2019 of amyotrophic lateral sclerosis (ALS) at the age of 63.

References

1956 births
2019 deaths
American women singers
American rock singers
American women rock singers
American pop rock singers
Neurological disease deaths in the United States
Deaths from motor neuron disease
Singers from Illinois
Vixen (band) members
21st-century American women